Minnitaki Lake is a large lake with numerous islands in Kenora District, Ontario, Canada. The nearest city is Sioux Lookout.

See also
List of lakes in Ontario

References

External links

Lakes of Kenora District